Collector's Item is an EP by the heavy metal band King Diamond. It is a collector's item shaped in a form of a head.

Track listing
"Moonlight" – 4:30
"'LOA' House" – 5:35
"Black Hill Sanitarium" – 4:28
"From the Other Side" – 3:49
"Voodoo" – 4:34

Credits
King Diamond - Vocals, Keyboards
Andy LaRocque - Guitars, Keyboards
Herb Simonsen - Guitar
Chris Estes - Bass
Darrin Anthony - Drums
John Luke Hebert - Drums
Dimebag Darrell - Solo on "Voodoo"

King Diamond albums
1999 EPs